Jesper Bech (born 25 May 1982) is a Danish former professional footballer. He played as a striker. He has gained two caps for the Denmark national team.

Biography
Bech played his youth years for Ålholm IF, Skjold Birkerød, B 1903, Lyngby BK and KB. He got his national breakthrough with F.C. Copenhagen in the Danish Superliga championship, where he debuted in April 2004. He scored seven goals in nine games during his first season, and helped the club win the 2003–04 Danish Superliga title as well as the 2004 Danish Cup trophy. In the following season, sharp competition from strikers Alvaro Santos and Sibusiso Zuma kept Bech out of his preferred striker role. He was either used as a substitute, or in the role of winger. Bech transferred to Swedish club Malmö FF in the summer 2005.

At Malmö, he looked to replace Swedish international striker Markus Rosenberg before the UEFA Champions League qualification, but Bech never got a breakthrough at the club. Following one year at Malmö, he moved back to Denmark to play for Esbjerg fB in the summer 2006. In the first half of the 2006–07 Superliga season, Bech rediscovered his goal scoring form, and was at a time the joint top goalscorer of the league. On 15 November 2006 he got his Danish national team debut in a friendly match against the Czech Republic, when he came on the pitch in the second half, as a substitute for Peter Løvenkrands.

Honours
Danish Superliga: 2004
Danish Cup: 2004

External links
 Career stats at Danmarks Radio 
 Danish national team profile 
 Jesper Bech on FC Roskilde 
 

1982 births
Living people
Danish men's footballers
Denmark international footballers
Denmark under-21 international footballers
Denmark youth international footballers
IF Skjold Birkerød players
F.C. Copenhagen players
Malmö FF players
Esbjerg fB players
Silkeborg IF players
Danish Superliga players
Allsvenskan players
Danish expatriate men's footballers
Expatriate footballers in Sweden
Association football forwards
FC Roskilde players
Danish expatriate sportspeople in Sweden
Boldklubben 1903 players
Lyngby Boldklub players
Kjøbenhavns Boldklub players